The Veterans Memorial Bridge, also known locally as the "Illinois River Bridge", and the "Rte 23 Bridge", is a four-lane concrete-deck road bridge that crosses the Illinois River in Ottawa, Illinois.

The bridge is the main and only road route within the city connecting Ottawa's south side to the center of the city, and is a part of Illinois Routes 23 and 71. The bridge connects to State Street on the south end, and to Columbus Street and La Salle Street on the north end, one-way streets in Ottawa's city center.

The key feature of the bridge is that it has a very high and long main span. The high and wide main span is much safer for the navigation of river traffic than the older bridge, which had a narrower central span. The bridge connects high to the bluff at the south end, is level for two spans, then connects low to the valley floor in the city center.

See also
List of crossings of the Illinois River

Bridges completed in 1981
Bridges in LaSalle County, Illinois
Bridges over the Illinois River
Concrete bridges in the United States